Phrasing may refer to:
 Phrasing (DJ)
 Musical phrasing
 Textual phrasing (linguistics)

See also
Phrase (disambiguation)

sv:Symboler i notskrift#Frasering